Nacoleia puncticostalis is a moth in the family Crambidae. It was described by George Hampson in 1899. It is found in Indonesia, where it has been recorded from the Maluku Islands (Batchian).

References

Moths described in 1899
Nacoleia
Moths of Indonesia